Alvaro Huerta is a joint faculty member of Urban & Region Planning (URP) and Ethnic & Women’s Studies (EWS) at California State Polytechnic University, Pomona. 

As an Associate Professor (effective August 17, 2020) and researcher, Huerta focuses on community and economic development, critical race theory, identity politics, Chicana/o and Latina/o studies, immigration and Mexican diaspora, social movements, social networks and the informal economy.

Early life 
A United States native, Huerta grew up in Colonia Libertad in Tijuana, and in the Ramona Gardens and Big Hazard housing projects in East Los Angeles. He attended public inner-city schools and was the first in his family to pursue higher education.

Education 
Huerta earned a Ph.D. from University of California, Berkeley, Department of City and Regional Planning. He also holds Master's and Bachelor's degrees from University of California, Los Angeles. Once interested in studying mathematics at University of California, Los Angeles, he switched his study to obtaining a major in history before eventually earning a Ph.D. in City and Regional planning.

Career 
Prior to his current Associate Professorship at University of California, Berkeley, Huerta was a Research Fellow at the Latinx Education Research Center, Santa Clara University. He was also previously a visiting scholar at the Chicano Studies Research Center, University of California, Los Angeles from 2010 to 2014. From 2010 to 2013, he also served as Adjunct Faculty in the Department of Urban Planning and Cesar E. Chavez Department of Chicana/o Studies, UCLA.

In 2011, Huerta received the American Planning Association's Paul Davidoff award.

Huerta has also contributed articles related to racial and working-class issues for numerous periodicals and online outlets, such as Boyle Heights Beat and LA Progressive. 

Before attending graduate school, Huerta was a community organizer in Los Angeles, and was instrumental in the defeat of a power plant in South Gate and in fighting the City of Los Angeles’ leaf-blower ban, which disproportionately affected immigrant gardeners.

Publications 

 Latina/o Immigrant Communities in the Xenophobic Era of Trump and Beyond (Hamilton Books | Rowman & Littlefield, June 2019)
 Reframing the Latino Immigration Debate: Towards a Humanistic Paradigm (San Diego State University Press, 2013)
 Lead editor of People of Color in the United States: Contemporary Issues in Education, Work, Communities, Health, and Immigration (Volume 4).

References 

University of California, Berkeley alumni
Hispanic and Latino American people
University of California, Los Angeles alumni
University of California, Berkeley faculty
Year of birth missing (living people)
Living people

California State Polytechnic University, Pomona faculty